The George Miller House is a rustic log cabin near Stehekin, Washington, United States, in Lake Chelan National Recreation Area.  The cabin was built in 1938 and continues to function as a residence.

It is a one-and-a-half-story log house  in plan with a shed-roofed addition for a kitchen on one side.  It is built on a rock foundation and has a brick chimney in the addition.

It was built Jack Blankenship in c.1938-c.1942, and was lived in by Guy "Dad Imus" Imus, Sr., during 1945–46.  It was purchased by George Miller in the late 1940s.

References

Buildings and structures in Stehekin, Washington
Houses completed in 1938
Houses in Chelan County, Washington
Houses on the National Register of Historic Places in Washington (state)
Log cabins in the United States
Rustic architecture in Washington (state)
National Register of Historic Places in Chelan County, Washington
Log buildings and structures on the National Register of Historic Places in Washington (state)